The 1975–76 Drexel Dragons men's basketball team represented Drexel University during the 1975–76 men's basketball season. The Dragons, led by 5th year head coach Ray Haesler, played their home games at the Daskalakis Athletic Center and were members of the East Coast Conference (ECC).

In a game against Ursinus on February 11, 1976, Drexel set team records for both team shooting percentage (63.4%) and margin of victory (51).

The team finished the season 17–6, and finished in 2nd place in the ECC East in the regular season.

Roster

Schedule

|-
!colspan=9 style="background:#F8B800; color:#002663;"| Exhibition
|-

|-
!colspan=9 style="background:#F8B800; color:#002663;"| Regular season
|-

Awards
Ray Haesler
ECC Coach of the Year

Doug Romanczuk
Baltimore Kiwanis Classic MVP

Bob Stephens
Converse Honorable Mention All-American
Herb Good Sportswriters Society All-Philadelphia Area Team
ECC Co-Rookie of the Year
ECC All-Conference Second Team
Leading Freshman Rebounder in NCAA Division I

References

Drexel Dragons men's basketball seasons
Drexel
1975 in sports in Pennsylvania
1976 in sports in Pennsylvania